This is a list of notable magazines on paranormal, anomalous and Fortean phenomena. These magazines are generally opposed by skeptical magazines.

 3rd Stone – an Earth mysteries magazine; defunct
 Explore: The Journal of Science & Healing
 Fate – broad array of accounts of the strange and unknown
 Fortean Times – publishes reports of anomalous phenomena and investigative articles
 Journal of Near-Death Studies
 Journal of Parapsychology
 Journal of Scientific Exploration – official research journal of the Society for Scientific Exploration
 Lobster – twice yearly magazine focused on parapolitics
 NeuroQuantology
 Nexus – UFOs, fringe science, conspiracy theory, alternative medicine
 Paranormal Review – magazine of the Society for Psychical Research
 Steamshovel Press – investigative articles, parapolitics, alternative history; self-described as "all conspiracy, no theory"; defunct
 UFO Magazine – American magazine, not to be confused with the now-defunct British UFO Magazine; defunct
 Weird NJ – deals with sightings of UFOs, ghosts, the Jersey Devil and other supernatural occurrences in the state of New Jersey

References

Magazines of anomalous phenomena
 
Magazines of anomalous phenomena
Paranormal